Desperate Remedies is a 1993 New Zealand drama film directed by Stewart Main and Peter Wells. It was screened in the Un Certain Regard section at the 1993 Cannes Film Festival.

Plot
Set in "Hope, New Britannia",  an overwrought nineteenth century New Zealand community seemingly on the edge of destruction, Dorothea Brooke (Ward-Lealand) is a shopkeeper and dress designer with a troubled past. She strives in vain to keep her feckless, opium-addicted sister Rose out of the clutches of her former lover, Fraser (Curtis). Dorothea is in a lesbian relationship with Anne Cooper (Chappell) but tempted by newcomer and former radical Lawrence Hayes (Smith). MP and war profiteer William Poyser (Hurst) wants her business and property to shore up his tottering career, through marriage. Dorothea, Anne and Lawrence become enmeshed in a tortured triangle, resolved when Lawrence agrees to marry Rose for convenience and to get her away from Fraser. Rose dies ravaged from her opium addiction, although Lawrence and Fraser have fought a battle on board a vessel as passengers and both are missing, presumed dead. Dorothea has been coerced into accepting Poyser in marriage.

Two years pass and Fraser returns, as does Lawrence. At an opera, a mise-en-abyme version of Fraser's sudden death is replayed – but the veiled female assailant turns out to be Anne, not Dorothea. Realising that Anne is her true love, Dorothea leaves Poyser to his fate, given the exposure of his financial mismanagement and gambling debts. Lawrence sees them off at the dock as they depart Hope, and Dorothea and Anne are last seen together at the vessel's helm, embracing and arm in arm.

Cast
 Jennifer Ward-Lealand as Dorothea Brook
 Kevin Smith as Lawrence Hayes
 Lisa Chappell as Anne Cooper
 Cliff Curtis as Fraser
 Michael Hurst as Willam Poyser
 Kiri Mills as Rose
 Bridget Armstrong as Mary Anne
 Timothy Raby as Mr. Weedle
 Helen Steemson as Gnits
 Geeling Ng as Su Lim (as Geeling Ching)

Production
The film was shot on a relatively modest budget of $2 million. As a money saving device it was mostly shot in a shed on the Auckland harbour. To further save on costs the cast members each played multiple roles. By utilising Fuji stock for its excessive colour the film was able to make the most of it costuming and art direction to create visuals that far exceeded what was to be expected from its budget.

Release and reception
Desperate Remedies premiered at the Miami Film Festival to wide acclaim. It appeared at many festivals including Cannes Film Festival, Kiev International Film Festival and the Turin Lesbian and Gay Film Festival. The film picked up many awards including Best Design and Best Film at Kiev and the Audience Prize in Turin. It was also well received in New Zealand, winning awards for Best Cinematography, Best Design and Best Costume Design at the 1994 New Zealand Film and Television Awards.

The film also garnered critical acclaim in the US and United Kingdom with many high-profile publications giving it positive reviews. In the US The New York Times described the film as "gorgeous but silly" while the Los Angeles Times noted that "Wells and Main never stumble, and their film emerges as a glittery triumph". In the UK the film received glowing reviews from NME who described it as "gloriously overblown, shamelessly camp and utterly wonderful" while The Sunday Times reviewed it as "Deliciously Dotty".

References

External links

 NZ On Screen page
Desperate Remedies (1993) at New Zealand Feature Film Database

1993 films
1993 drama films
1993 LGBT-related films
Films directed by Peter Wells
Lesbian-related films
New Zealand LGBT-related films
New Zealand drama films
1990s English-language films